Sechelt is a district municipality in British Columbia, Canada.

Sechelt could also refer to:

Sechelt (steamboat), also known as Hattie Hanson
Shishalh, a First Nations group in the region, also known as the Sechelt
Sechelt language, the language spoken by the Shishalh
Sechelt Aerodrome
Sechelt Inlet, an inlet
Sechelt Peninsula, a peninsula created by the inlet
Sechelt Indian Band
Sechelt Indian Government District, a municipality